Josué Brachi García (born 8 September 1992) is a Spanish male weightlifter, competing in the 56 kg category and representing Spain at international competitions. He participated at the 2016 Summer Olympics in the men's 56 kg event. He competed at world championships, including at the 2015 World Weightlifting Championships.

Major results

References

1992 births
Living people
Spanish male weightlifters
Place of birth missing (living people)
Weightlifters at the 2016 Summer Olympics
Olympic weightlifters of Spain
Mediterranean Games bronze medalists for Spain
Mediterranean Games medalists in weightlifting
Competitors at the 2018 Mediterranean Games
Competitors at the 2022 Mediterranean Games
European Weightlifting Championships medalists
21st-century Spanish people